Popularity is Jonezetta's debut album, released by Tooth & Nail Records on October 3, 2006.

Track listing
 "Welcome Home" – 4:02
 "Get Ready (Hot Machete)" – 3:13
 "Communicate" – 3:27
 "Man In a 3k Suit" – 3:30
 "Backstabber" – 2:25
 "Popularity" – 3:33
 "The Love That Carries Me" – 3:42
 "The City We Live In" – 4:39
 "Bringin' It Back Tonite...Everybody Start" – 3:12
 "Burn It Down!" – 3:18
 "Imagination" – 3:59

References

External links
Get Ready (Hot Machete) Music Video

2006 debut albums
Jonezetta albums
Tooth & Nail Records albums